Craig Groenewald (born 20 March 1979 in Johannesburg) is a paralympic swimmer from South Africa competing mainly in category S14 events.

Craig competed in his first Paralympic games in 1996 where he won bronze in both the 50m freestyle and 100m freestyle. Four years later in the 2000 Summer Paralympics he again won two bronze medals, this time in the 50m freestyle and 200m freestyle, he also finished fourth in the 100m freestyle, fifth in the 50m butterfly and missed out on qualifying for the final of the 100m breaststroke and 200m medley.

References

External links
 
 

1979 births
Living people
Swimmers from Johannesburg
South African male freestyle swimmers
S14-classified Paralympic swimmers
Paralympic medalists in swimming
Paralympic swimmers of South Africa
Paralympic bronze medalists for South Africa
Swimmers at the 1996 Summer Paralympics
Swimmers at the 2000 Summer Paralympics
Medalists at the 1996 Summer Paralympics
Medalists at the 2000 Summer Paralympics
20th-century South African people
21st-century South African people